APIB may refer to:

Military
 АПИБ (авиацио́нный полк истребителей-бомбардировщиков), Russian for a fighter-bomber aviation regiment, particularly in the Soviet Air Forces
 Advanced primer ignition blowback, a design feature of some firearms

Political
 MÉS-APIB, a name under which the Spanish political party Més per Mallorca has stood for election
 Articulação dos Povos Indígenas do Brasil (Articulation of the Indigenous Peoples of Brazil), an organization representing indigenous Brazilian ethnic groups and led by Sônia Guajajara

Other
 Assessment of Preterm Infants’ Behavior, a standardized comprehensive test for the newly born
 APiB, a nickname for Alpha Pi Beta (ΑΠΒ), a sorority established at the University of Northern British Columbia in 1994